is a Japanese manga artist. She is best known for her series Forest of Piano, which has been adapted as an anime film and received the Grand Prize for manga at the 2008 Japan Media Arts Festival. She won the 1994 Kodansha Manga Award for general manga for Hanada Shōnen-shi, which has also been adapted as both an anime television series and a live-action film. From November 2021 to August 2022, Isshiki worked with Takashi Nagasaki on Child from the Dark, based on Nagasaki's novel Yomi Nemuru Mori -Daigo Shinji no Hakuran Suiri File-. Isshiki was credited as  during the manga's serialization in Big Comic, but is credited by her real name in its tankōbon.

Selected works 
 Denaoshitoide! - Big Comic Spirits, 1988–95, 6 volumes
 Hanada Shōnen-shi ("The Chronicles of Young Hanada") - Mr. Magazine, 1993–95, 4 + 1 volumes
 Hassuru - Big Comic Spirits, 1996–97, 6 volumes
 Gyojin-Sou kara Ai wo Komete ("With Love from Gyojin Inn") - Shōnen Jump Deluxe, 1998, 1 volume
 Forest of Piano ("Piano Forest") - Young Magazine Uppers, Weekly Morning, 1998–2015, 26 volumes
  - Written by Takashi Nagasaki, Big Comic, 2021–2022, 2 volumes
 13-nichi ni wa Hana wo Kazatte - Big Comic Original Zokan, 2023–present

References

External links 
 Makoto Isshiki's website 
 
 Profile at The Ultimate Manga Page

Living people
Manga artists
Winner of Kodansha Manga Award (General)
Year of birth missing (living people)